Ramona Milano is a Canadian actress. She is best known for her role as Francesca Vecchio in Due South and more recently as Teresa in Cra$h & Burn and as Audra Torres in Degrassi: The Next Generation.  She has also appeared in numerous commercials, for companies such as Rogers, The Co-operators, Colour Catcher and Sleep Country Canada. Milano also co-hosted Living Romance on the W Network.

Personal life
Milano graduated from the Etobicoke School of the Arts in 1987 and performed as a vocalist at Canada's Wonderland before entering the theatre arts program at Humber College. She is married with two children.

Stage work 
 The Numbers Game (2019) Globus Theatre
 Storm Warning by Norm Foster (2018) Bruce County Playhouse
 The Christmas Tree by Norm Foster (2015) Hamilton & Toronto, ON (Directed by Darren Stewart-Jones)
 God of Carnage (2014) – role: Veronica Novak at the Sudbury Theatre Centre in Sudbury, ON. (Directed by Rod Ceballos)
 Game Show (2004) An audience participation production mimicking a TV gameshow set

Awards 
Milano has been nominated twice for Gemini Awards, in 1997 and 1999. Both nominations were for "Best Performance by an Actress in a Featured Supporting Role in a Dramatic Series" for her role as Francesca Vecchio in Due South.

Filmography

References

External link 

1969 births
Canadian television actresses
Actresses from Toronto
Canadian people of Italian descent
Canadian people of Portuguese descent
Living people